QPIX was a not-for-profit film and television training organisation based in the Brisbane inner-city suburb of Annerley.  QPIX was the Queensland arm of Screen Australia It provided courses

QPIX closed its doors in 2014 amid ongoing allegations of bullying, violence and discriminatory behaviour by its staff and students. A Brisbane-based not-for-profit film and television training organisation, QPIX was the Queensland member of Screen Development Australia (SDA)   which also included Metro Screen (NSW), Open Channel (Vic),  Media Resource Centre (SA), Wide Angle Tasmania (Tas) and FTI (WA).

QPIX provided career development for filmmakers and assistance developing and producing film and television projects. It received financial support from Screen Queensland at a state level and Screen Australia at a Federal level and offered opportunities to Queensland filmmakers through initiatives such as the Raw Nerve Short Film Initiative and the White Heat Short film program. Past films developed by QPIX include:

References

External links 
 Official Site

Film schools in Australia